Haffar-e Sharqi (also Romanized as Ḩaffār-e Sharqī and Haffār-e Sharqī) is a village in Howmeh-ye Sharqi Rural District, in the Central District of Khorramshahr County, Khuzestan Province, Iran. At the 2006 census, its population was 1,980, in 411 families.

References 

Populated places in Khorramshahr County